Mohammad Rimon Hossian (born 1 July 2005), known as Rimon, is a Bangladeshi professional footballer who plays as a left back for Bashundhara Kings and the Bangladesh national team.

International career
In March 2021, Rimon was called up to the senior Bangladesh national team for the 2021 Three Nations Cup.

Before his full international debut, Rimon played a match against Kyrgyzstan U-23 for Bangladesh.

On 29 March 2021, Rimon made his senior debut against Nepal in 2021 Three Nations Cup.

Career statistics

Club

Notes

International apps

References

Living people
2005 births
Bangladeshi footballers
People from Naogaon District
Bangladesh international footballers
Association football defenders
Bashundhara Kings players